Dalima mjoebergi is a moth of the family Geometridae. It is endemic to Borneo.

References

External links
The Moths of Borneo

Boarmiini
Moths described in 1926